Zheng Zhemin (2 October 1924 – 25 August 2021), also romanized as Cheng Chemin, was a Chinese explosives engineer and physicist specializing in explosive mechanics.

Biography 
Zheng is a native of Yin County (now Yinzhou District) of Ningbo, Zhejiang Province, and was born in Jinan of Shandong Province. He obtained a BS from Tsinghua University in 1947, and his MS and PhD from California Institute of Technology.

In 1955, Zheng returned to China and later served as Director of the Institute of Mechanics of the Chinese Academy of Sciences (CAS), President of the Chinese Mechanical Society, and Editor-in-Chief of the Chinese Journal of Theoretical and Applied Mechanics.

He joined the Chinese Communist Party in 1983.

He died from an illness in Beijing, on 25 August 2021, aged 96.

Honors and awards 
 1980, Academician of the Chinese Academy of Sciences
 1993, Foreign associate of the United States National Academy of Engineering
 1993, Tan Kah Kee Science Award
 1994, Academician of the Chinese Academy of Engineering
 2012, State Preeminent Science and Technology Award

References

External links 
 郑哲敏：一切皆力之变
 郑哲敏：爆炸传奇 (Cheng Chemin: the legand of explosion)
 Xinhuanet.com Zheng Zhemin – explosion specialist

1924 births
2021 deaths
California Institute of Technology alumni
Educators from Shandong
Engineers from Shandong
Engineers from Zhejiang
Explosives engineers
Foreign associates of the National Academy of Engineering
Members of the Chinese Academy of Engineering
Members of the Chinese Academy of Sciences
People from Jinan
Physicists from Shandong
Physicists from Zhejiang
Tsinghua University alumni
Academic staff of Tsinghua University
Chinese expatriates in the United States